Robert Johnstone was a Scottish professional footballer who played as an outside left for Sunderland.

References

Footballers from West Dunbartonshire
Scottish footballers
Association football outside forwards
Renton F.C. players
Sunderland A.F.C. players
Dumbarton F.C. players
Third Lanark A.C. players
Dunfermline Athletic F.C. players
English Football League players
Scottish Football League players
People from Renton, West Dunbartonshire